Year 1028 (MXXVIII) was a leap year starting on Monday (link will display the full calendar) of the Julian calendar.

Events 
 By place 
 Byzantine Empire 
 November 11 – Emperor Constantine VIII dies at Constantinople after a 3-year reign. On his deathbed, and without a male heir, Constantine arranges that his eldest daughter, Zoë Porphyrogenita, succeeds him and marries the Byzantine nobleman, Romanos III (Argyros).
 November 15 – Zoë Porphyrogenita takes the throne as empress consort. Her husband, Romanos III (age 60) becomes emperor of the Byzantine Empire.

 England 
 Cnut the Great sails from England to Norway with a fleet of 50 ships. He defeats Olaf Haraldsson and is crowned king of Norway. Cnut becomes the sole ruler of England, Denmark and part of Sweden (known as the Danish North Sea Empire).

 Europe 
 April 14 – The 10-year-old Henry III (the Black), son of Emperor Conrad II (the Elder), is elected and crowned king of Germany in Aachen Cathedral by Pilgrim, archbishop of Cologne.
 King Sancho Garcés III (the Great) conquers Castile (modern Spain) (approximate date).

Births 
 February 17 – Al-Juwayni, Persian scholar and imam (d. 1085)
 Burchard II (or Bucco), bishop of Halberstadt (approximate date)
 Nuño Álvarez de Carazo, Spanish nobleman and warrior (d. 1054)
 Qutb Shah, Persian Sufi religious leader and scholar (d. 1099)
 Robert of Molesme, founder of the Cistercian Order (d. 1111)
 William I (the Conqueror), king of England (approximate date) (d. 1087)

Deaths 
 January 3 – Fujiwara no Michinaga, Japanese nobleman (b. 966)
 August 7 – Alfonso V (the Noble), king of León (Spain) (b. 994)
 November 11 – Constantine VIII, Byzantine emperor (b. 960)
 Lin Bu (or Junfu), Chinese poet and calligrapher (b. 967)
 Liu Wenzhi, Chinese official of the Song Dynasty (b. 964)
 Lý Công Uẩn, founder of the Vietnamese Lý Dynasty (b. 974)
 Qawam al-Dawla, Buyid governor and ruler of Kerman (b. 1000)
 Sayyida Shirin, Bavandid princess and wife of Fakhr al-Dawla
 William of Bellême, French nobleman (House of Bellême)

References